Rodrigues Alves is a municipality located in the west of the Brazilian state of Acre. Its population is 19,351 according to the 2020 estimates.

The municipality contains 13.45% of the  Serra do Divisor National Park, created in 1989.

Population

References

External links 

 Rodrigues Alves' municipal government

Municipalities in Acre (state)